Francisco Cabello (born 6 December 1972) is a former professional tennis player from Argentina.

Career
Cabello was ranked 465 in the world when he made his ATP debut at the 1997 Estoril Open, but managed to defeat third seed Wayne Ferreira. He came from 0–3 down in the third and deciding set, to defeat the South African, who was the world's 10th ranked player at the time.

He was a doubles quarter-finalist at Barcelona in 1999, with partner Francisco Costa. The pair of qualifiers had a win over top seeds and the previous year's finalists Ellis Ferreira and Rick Leach in the round of 16.

Challenger titles

Singles: (1)

Doubles: (2)

References

1972 births
Living people
Argentine male tennis players
Sportspeople from Santa Fe, Argentina